The Expedition to the Moulouya was an expedition conducted by Arudj Reis after he seized Tlemcen and the Mechouar from its Spanish client with the help of his ally, Ahmad al-Kadi.

Arudj Reis and his ally, Ahmad al-Kadi, acted on the request of Tlemcen's inhabitants to free the city of its Spanish yoke. They scored a victory at Sidi Bel Abbess and seized the city of Tlemcen.

Following the seizure of Tlemcen, Arudj Reis made conquests in the eastern lands of Morocco. He pushed his conquests to the Moulouya. He captured and garrisoned Tibda, Oujda and Debdou. He then conducted raids in the lands of the Beni Snassen and forced the Beni Amer and Beni Snassen to recognise his authority and imposed a tribute on them.

After these successes, the Spanish sought to take back Tlemcen and restore a client ruler, this ultimately resulted in the Fall of Tlemcen (1518).

References

16th century in Morocco